Carlos St. John Phillips (born August 26, 1986), known professionally as Saint Jhn (stylized as SAINt JHN; pronounced "Saint John"), is a Guyanese-American rapper, singer, songwriter, and record producer.

He is best known for the 2019 remix to his 2016 song "Roses". The remix, produced by Kazakh DJ Imanbek, reached the top 5 of the US Billboard Hot 100 and topped the charts in Australia, Canada, the Netherlands, Ireland, New Zealand, and the United Kingdom. The song became the lead single for Saint Jhn's third studio album, While the World Was Burning released on November 20, 2020. Prior, he released his debut album Collection One in 2018, which was followed by Ghetto Lenny's Love Songs, an album released in 2019.

He has written songs for Kanye West, Jidenna, Usher, Hoodie Allen, and Kiesza, among others. He is a founding member of the music collective Gødd Complexx.

Early life 
Phillips was born in Brooklyn, New York City, and raised in Georgetown, Guyana. Growing up, he split his time in three-year intervals between Guyana and the East New York neighborhood of Brooklyn. He began creating music when he was twelve years old and was inspired by his older brother, who would rap in the neighborhood with friends. He wrote his first song in his first year of high school while living in Guyana.

Career 
Prior to adopting the Saint Jhn stage name, he performed and wrote using his birth name, Carlos St. John (or Carlos Saint John). In 2010, he released an EP, The St. John Portfolio, and a mixtape, In Association, under his birth name. Soon after, he was flown to Los Angeles, California, by music executive Zach Katz. For two months, he wrote songs for Rihanna, but none of his records were accepted. After returning home, Saint Jhn co-wrote the Hoodie Allen song, "No Interruption". In the following years, Saint Jhn wrote songs for Kiesza, Gorgon City, and Nico & Vinz, among others. In 2016, he earned a writer credit for the Usher songs, "Crash" and "Rivals", both of which appeared on the album Hard II Love. Also in 2016, he released his first song under the moniker Saint Jhn, entitled "1999". He followed that with two more songs in 2016, "Roses" and "Reflex". In October 2016, it was announced that Saint Jhn would open for Post Malone during a run of shows on the West Coast.

In February 2017, Jidenna's album, The Chief, was released featuring the song, "Helicopters / Beware", which Saint Jhn co-wrote. The following month, Saint Jhn released another original track, "3 Below". In October of that year, he played at two festivals, Rolling Loud and the Voodoo Experience. He also released another new song, "Hermes Freestyle". In February 2018, Saint Jhn released "I Heard You Got Too Litt Last Night". In early March, he released the song, "Albino Blue", and on March 30, 2018, his debut album was released. At that time, the already-released songs on the album had accrued 50 million total streams on various platforms. In addition to working on music and a tour in support of Collection One, Saint Jhn was hired by Gucci as a model for its "Guilty" campaign alongside Adesuwa Aighewi. In April 2020, Saint Jhn's single "Roses" hit number one on the ARIA Charts as well as the UK Singles Chart, surged by the release of the Imanbek remix. The song later received two other remixes, with Future and J Balvin, respectively.

In early October 2020, Saint Jhn was among the acts who performed live for the 2020 Billboard Music Awards, following the success of "Roses". On October 23, 2020, he released the video for the single, "Gorgeous", which serves as the lead single for his third studio album, While the World Was Burning. On October 26, he revealed the album's artwork, tracklist, and release date as November 20, 2020. The album includes the songs "High School Reunion, Prom", featuring Lil Uzi Vert, "Monica Lewinsky, Election Year", featuring DaBaby and A Boogie wit da Hoodie, as well as "Pray 4 Me", featuring Kanye West.

In December 2022, Saint Jhn and London on Da Track released "Stadiums" as the first single for their upcoming collaborative album.

Discography

Studio albums

Extended plays

Mixtapes

Singles

As lead artist

As featured artist

Songwriting and production

Notes

References

External links 

Saint Jhn on SoundCloud
Official website

1986 births
Living people
American people of Guyanese descent
21st-century Guyanese male singers
American hip hop singers
Rappers from Brooklyn
21st-century American rappers
African-American rappers
Grammy Award winners
21st-century African-American musicians
20th-century African-American people
LGBT African Americans
Trap musicians
American contemporary R&B singers